Frank Hunting (8 March 1910 – 22 December 1999) was an Australian rules footballer who played with Essendon in the Victorian Football League (VFL).

Notes

External links 
		

1910 births
1999 deaths
Australian rules footballers from Victoria (Australia)
Essendon Football Club players